George Mayer was an American gymnast. He competed in four events at the 1904 Summer Olympics, winning a bronze medal in the team event.

References

Year of birth missing
Year of death missing
American male artistic gymnasts
Olympic gymnasts of the United States
Gymnasts at the 1904 Summer Olympics
Place of birth missing
Olympic bronze medalists for the United States in gymnastics
Medalists at the 1904 Summer Olympics